Fladerer Bay is a bay about  long and  wide between Wirth Peninsula and Rydberg Peninsula in Ellsworth Land, Antarctica. It was mapped by the United States Geological Survey from surveys and U.S. Navy air photos, 1961–66, and was named by the Advisory Committee on Antarctic Names for Captain George Fladerer, commander of USNS Eltanin on Antarctic cruises.

References 

Bays of Ellsworth Land